Dungi is a small town in the Azad Kashmir region of Pakistan. It is about 25 km from Kotli. The road from Dungi leads to Khoi Ratta, a town located near the line of Control between Pakistan and India. 

Populated places in Kotli District